Palaces is a 1927 French silent film directed by Jean Durand and starring Léon Bary, Huguette Duflos, and Christiane Favier.

Cast
 Léon Bary as Marquis d'Areghi  
 Huguette Duflos as Nadia de Hock  
 Christiane Favier as Marie Van Bergen  
 Gaston Norès as Dick de Meslay 
 Pierre Denols as Baron de Hock  
 André Volbert as Raoul Michel  
 Blanche Beaume as Madame Bassano  
 Madame Desgranges as Madame de Hock  
 Norka Rouskaya as herself - the dancer  
 José Padilla as himself

References

Bibliography 
 Goble, Alan. The Complete Index to Literary Sources in Film. Walter de Gruyter, 1999.

External links 
 

1927 films
French silent films
1920s French-language films
Films directed by Jean Durand
French black-and-white films
1920s French films